Kishkino is a rural locality (a village) in Semyonkovskoye Rural Settlement, Vologodsky District, Vologda Oblast, Russia. The population was 2 as of 2002.

Geography 
The distance to Vologda is 16 km, to Semyonkovo is 8 km. Molbishcha, Petrakovo, Turbachevo are the nearest rural localities.

References 

Rural localities in Vologodsky District